Oliver Ringelhahn (born 1969 in Tulln an der Donau) is an Austrian opera, operetta, songs and oratorio singer (tenor).

References

External links
 
 Oliver Ringelhahn Homepage
 
 

1969 births
Living people
People from Tulln an der Donau
Austrian operatic tenors
Date of birth missing (living people)